The 2012 Saskatchewan Scotties Tournament of Hearts, Saskatchewan's women's provincial curling championship, was held from January 25 to 29 at the Humboldt Curling Club in Humboldt, Saskatchewan. The winning team of Michelle Englot, represented Saskatchewan at the 2012 Scotties Tournament of Hearts in Red Deer, Alberta, where the team went 5-6 in round robin play.

Qualification process
Twelve teams will qualify for the provincial tournament through several berths. The qualification process is as follows:

Teams

Standings

Pool A

Pool B

Results

Draw 1
January 25, 2:00 PM CT

Draw 2
January 25, 7:30 PM CT

Draw 3
January 26, 2:00 PM CT

Draw 4
January 26, 7:30 PM CT

Draw 5
January 27, 10:00 AM CT

Draw 6
January 27, 2:30 PM CT

Draw 7
January 27, 7:30 PM CT

Draw 8
January 28, 9:00 AM CT

Tiebreaker
January 28, 2:00 PM CT

Playoffs

A1 vs. B1
January 28, 7:30 PM CT

A2 vs. B2
January 28, 7:30 PM CT

Semifinal
January 29, 1:00 PM CT

Final
January 29, 5:00 PM CT

Qualification rounds

Northern Qualification
The 2012 SaskPower Women's Northern Playdown took place from January 13 to 15 at the Prince Albert Curling Club in Prince Albert. The format of play was an open-entry triple knockout, and four teams qualified to the provincial playoffs.

Teams

A Event

B Event

C Event

Southern Qualification
The 2012 SaskPower Women's Southern Playdown took place from January 13 to 15 at the Weyburn Curling Club in Weyburn. The format of play was an open-entry triple knockout, and four teams qualified to the provincial playoffs.

Teams

A-Event

B-Event

C-Event

References

Saskatchewan
Saskatchewan Scotties Tournament of Hearts
Humboldt, Saskatchewan
Curling in Saskatchewan